Daras is a surname. Notable people with the surname include:

Bogdan Daras (born 1960), Polish sport wrestler
Dimitrios Daras (born 1956), Greek footballer
José Daras (born 1948), Belgian politician

See also
 Dara
 Taras (surname)